The 2016 Tulsa Roughnecks FC season was the club's second season of existence, and their second in the United Soccer League in the third division of American soccer. Including the previous iterations of franchises named "Tulsa Roughnecks", this was the 16th season of a soccer club named the "Roughnecks" playing in the Tulsa metropolitan area.

Outside of the USL, the Roughnecks participated in the 2016 U.S. Open Cup.

Roster

Competitions

USL

Standings

U.S. Open Cup

References 

2016 USL season
2016
2016 in sports in Oklahoma
American soccer clubs 2016 season